Other Americas is a collection of science fiction stories by author Norman Spinrad. It was originally published by Bantam Spectra in 1988.

Contents
 "Street Meat". This novelette was originally published in Isaac Asimov's Science Fiction Magazine, Mid-December 1983
 "The Lost Continent". This novelette was originally published in Science Against Man in 1970 
 "World War Last". This novella was originally published in Isaac Asimov's Science Fiction Magazine, August 1985
 "La Vie Continue", novella.

References

Science fiction short story collections
1988 short story collections
American short story collections
Bantam Spectra books